The 2018–19 Utah State Aggies women's basketball team represents Utah State University in the 2018–19 NCAA Division I women's basketball season. The Aggies were led by seventh year head coach Jerry Finkbeiner. The Aggies played their home games at the Smith Spectrum and were members of the Mountain West Conference. They finished the season 17–16, 10–8 in Mountain West play to finish in a tie for fifth place. They advanced to the quarterfinals of the Mountain West women's tournament where they lost to Wyoming. They revived an invitation to the WBI where they defeated UC Riverside before losing to North Texas in the quarterfinals

Roster

Schedule

|-
!colspan=9 style=| Exhibition

|-
!colspan=9 style=| Non-conference regular season

|-
!colspan=9 style=| Mountain West regular season

|-
!colspan=9 style=|Mountain West Women's Tournament

|-
!colspan=9 style=|WBI

See also
2018–19 Utah State Aggies men's basketball team

References 

Utah State
Utah State Aggies women's basketball seasons
Aggies
Aggies
Utah State